Nechisar National Park (or Nech-Sar National Park) is a national park in the Southern Nations, Nationalities, and Peoples' Region (SNNPR) of Ethiopia.It is in the Great Rift Valley, within the southwestern Ethiopian Highlands.

Geography
The  park includes the "Bridge of God", an isthmus between Lake Abaya and Lake Chamo, and the Nechisar plains east of the lakes. It is east of Arba Minch.

Nechisar National Park was established in 1974. Under the management of African Parks Network (APN since 2005, it was reportedly scheduled to hand over management to the Ethiopian government in June 2008.

History and management 
As part of a 1960s UNESCO plan to protect and conserve nature and natural resources in Ethiopia, a two person team of UNESCO consultants spent three months surveying most major wildlife areas in Ethiopia, and officially submitted to the Wildlife Conservation Board in 1965 their recommendations, which included a game reserve to the east of Lake Chamo to provide protection for the population of Swayne's hartebeest and other local wildlife.

Nechsar National Park was proposed in 1967, then officially established in 1974. Since then it has not legally been gazetted, but has functioned as de facto national park. Following the recommendations of the Ethiopian Ministry of Agriculture recommendation, in 1982 the local Guji, who had been living as pastoralists in the lowlands beside Lake Abaya and Chamo "were forcibly evicted from the park at gun point".

In the lawless period at the end of the Derg rule and immediately afterwards, Nechisar suffered much damage. Park buildings located far from the headquarters were looted and damaged. At the same time, the local Guji returned to their traditional grazing areas. According to one source, they fled there from the attacks of the Borena Oromo, who in turn were victimized by neighboring ethnic groups, their presence degrading the environment and contributing to the local extinction of many species. The Guji also acquired firearms during this period, and used them to resist eviction from the park afterwards. In 2005, Refugees International criticized their eviction.

In 2005, the management responsibility for Nechisar National Park was handed over to APN.

While tourism in Ethiopia has increased in the park in recent years, doubling each year from 5300 tourists in 2005 to 20,500 in 2007, in October 2008 APN announced that they were ending management of Nechisar National Park. In a magazine article reprinted on their website, APN claims that sustainable management of the Ethiopian parks is incompatible with "the irresponsible way of living of some of the ethnic groups". African Parks added that the emphasis for resettling inhabitants out of the park, rather than educating them to work with them, came from the Ethiopian government. APN was told that the Guji were an Oromo people, and "they belong in the adjoining Oromiya province, not among the Gamo and Gofa peoples of the Southern District, where the park is".

Geography and landscape

The important regional centre to the park is Arba Minch in the Main Ethiopian Rift. Approximately 15% of the park consists of lakes including Lake Abaya in the north and Lake Chamo in the south. Part of the habitat consists of the groundwater forest and shoreline of the lakes, but there are also dry grassy plains. The altitude ranges from 1,108 meters above sea level at the shore of Lake Chamo to 1,650 meters on Mount Tabala in the north-east, renowned for its hot springs.
Taller trees found in the park include Dichrostachys cinerea, Acacia tortilis, Balanites aegyptiaca and less common Acacia nilotica. The southern part of the park is dominated by edaphic grassland and a calcareous black clay soil underneath with Dobera glabra, Acacia tortilis and the grass Chrysopogon aucheri forming much of the landscape. Both invasive species and woody plant encroachment are a threat to the biodiversity of the national park.

Wildlife 

Wildlife in the park include plains zebra, Grant's gazelle, dik-dik, Hippopotamus, African leopard, Spotted hyena, and greater kudu as well as one of the last three populations of the endangered Swayne's hartebeest, Lion, and Cheetah. A stretch of the northwest shore of Lake Chamo is known as Crocodile Market, where hundreds of Nile crocodiles gather to bask. The park also hosts bushbuck, waterbuck, bushpig, Anubis baboon, vervet monkeys, and black-backed jackal. The endangered African wild dog Lycaon pictus, once existed in the park, but may now be extirpated due to human population pressures in this region.
In 2009, a small group of less than 23 lions were estimated in and around the protected area.

Nechisar National Park is considered an important habitat for birds including kingfishers, storks, pelicans, flamingos and African fish eagles.

References

External links 
 The National Parks of Ethiopia: Nechisar National Park (Addis Tribune)
 World Database on Protected Areas factsheet on Nechisar National Park

National parks of Ethiopia
Ethiopian Highlands
Great Rift Valley
Protected areas of Southern Nations, Nationalities, and Peoples' Region
Protected areas established in 1974
1974 establishments in Ethiopia
Somali Acacia-Commiphora bushlands and thickets
Important Bird Areas of Ethiopia